The 1987 Open Championship was a men's major golf championship and the 116th Open Championship, held from 16–19 July at Muirfield Golf Links in Gullane, Scotland. Nick Faldo won the first of his three Open Championships, one stroke ahead of runners-up Paul Azinger and Rodger Davis. It was the first of Faldo's six major championships. It was the first win at The Open by an Englishman since Tony Jacklin in 1969.

This was the thirteenth Open Championship held at Muirfield; the previous was in 1980 and the next in 1992.

Past champions in the field

Made the cut

Missed the cut

Round summaries

First round
Thursday, 16 July 1987

Second round
Friday, 17 July 1987

Amateurs: Mayo (E), Willison (+4), Winchester (+6), Curry (+9), Hardin (+11), Bottomley (+12), Hird (+12), O'Connell (+12), Ambridge (+13), George (+13), Robinson (+13), Jones (+16), Hamer (+17).

Third round
Saturday, 18 July 1987

After tolerable weather conditions for the first two days, the third round on Saturday was played in a storm of wind and rain.

Source

Final round
Sunday, 19 July 1987

The final round was played in a gray mist. Azinger had a three stroke lead at the turn which was soon reduced to one, where it remained through 16 holes. Using a driver at the par-5 17th, he found a fairway bunker off the tee and bogeyed. Now tied with Faldo, Azinger's approach shot from the fairway on 18 found the left greenside bunker and led to another bogey. In the pairing just ahead, Faldo parred all 18 holes to win his first major by a stroke.

Amateurs: Mayo (+13), Willison (+21)
Source:

References

External links
Muirfield 1987 (Official site)
116th Open Championship - Muirfield (European Tour)

The Open Championship
Golf tournaments in Scotland
Open Championship
Open Championship
Open Championship